Alucita helena is a moth of the family Alucitidae. It is found in Russia (the South Siberian Mountains).

References

Moths described in 1993
Alucitidae
Moths of Asia